Gillian may refer to:

Places
 Gillian Settlement, Arkansas, an unincorporated community

People
Gillian (variant Jillian) is an English feminine given name, frequently shortened to Gill.
It originates as a feminine form of the name Julian, Julio, Julius, and Julien. It is also in use as a surname.

Notable people with the name include:

First name 
 Gillian Alexy (born 1986), Australian actress
 Gillian Allnutt (born 1949), English poet
 Gillian Anderson (born 1968), American actress
 Gillian Apps (born 1983), Canadian ice hockey player
 Gillian Armstrong (born 1950), Australian film director
 Gillian Avery (born 1926), British children's novelist and literary historian
 Gillian Ayres (born 1930), English painter
 Gillian Bailey (born 1955), British academic and actress
 Gillian Barge (1940–2003), English actress
 Gillian Baverstock (1931–2007), British author
 Gillian Baxter, British writer
 Gillian Beer (born 1935), British literary critic
 Gillian Bevan (born 1950), British actress
 Gillian Blake (born 1949), British actress
 Gillian Blakeney (born 1966), Australian dance musician
 Gillian Bonner (born 1966), American model
 Gillian Bouras (born 1945), Australian writer
 Gillian Boxx (born 1973), American Olympic medalist
 Gillian Bradshaw (born 1956), American writer
 Gillian Carnegie (born 1971), English artist
 Gillian Chan (born 1954), Canadian children's author
 Gillian Chung (born 1981), Hong Kong singer
 Gillian Clark (aid worker) (c. 1956–2003), Canadian humanitarian
 Gillian Clark (born 1961), English badminton player
 Gillian Clarke (born 1937), Welsh poet
 Gillian Condy (born 1952), South African botanical artist
 Gillian Conoley (born 1955), American poet
 Gillian Coultard (born 1963), English football player
 Gillian Cowley (born 1955), Zimbabwean field hockey player
Gillian Cowlishaw (born 1934), New Zealand-born anthropologist
 Gillian Cross (born 1945), English children's writer
 Gillian Elisa (born 1953), Welsh actress
 Gillian Evans, British philosopher
 Gillian Ferrari (born 1980), Canadian ice hockey player
 Gillian Findlay, Canadian television journalist
 Gillian Florence, Canadian rugby union player 
 Gillian Flynn, American author and television critic
 Gillian Foulger, English geologist
 Gillian Galbraith, Scottish crime writer
 Gillian Gilbert (born 1961), British keyboardist, guitarist and vocalist
 Gillian Gilks (born 1950), English badminton player
 Gillian Gowers (born 1964), English badminton player
Gillian Greer, New Zealand literary scholar 
 Gillian Guess (born 1955), Canadian criminal
 Gillian Hills (born 1944), film actress
 Gillian Horovitz (born 1955), English long-distance runner
 Gillian Howell (1927–2000), British architect
 Gillian Howie, English philosopher
 Gillian Jacobs (born 1982), American stage and film actress
 Gillian Jones, Australian actress
 Gillian Joseph (born 1969), British newscaster
 Gillian Kearney (born 1972), English actress
 Gillian Knight (born 1934), English singer and actor
 Gillian Lindsay (born 1973), Scottish rower
 Gillian Lowndes (born 1936), English ceramic sculptor
 Gillian Lucky (born 1967), Trinidad and Tobago politician and lawyer
 Gillian Lynne (born 1926), British ballerina, actor, theatre and television director, and choreographer
 Gillian McConway, English cricketer
 Gillian McCutcheon (born 1939), British actress
 Gillian McKeith (born 1959), Scottish non-fiction writer
 Gillian Merron (born 1959), British politician
 Gillian Moore, retired Australian school principal
 Gillian Morgan (born 1953), British civil servant
 Gillian Murphy (born 1979), American dancer
 Gillian Norris (born 1978), Irish dancer and model
 Gillian O'Sullivan (born 1976), Irish race walker
 Gillian Oliver (born 1943), British nurse
 Gillian Porter (born 1965), Northern Irish television presenter
 Gillian Pugh, British social welfare official
 Gillian Rolton (born 1956), Australian equestrian
 Gillian Rose (1947–1995), British scholar
 Gillian Rose (geographer) (born 1962), British geographer
 Gillian Rubinstein (born 1942), Australian children's author and playwright
 Gillian Russell (born 1973), Jamaican athlete
 Gillian Sewell (born 1972), Canadian field hockey player
 Gillian Sheen (1928–2021), British fencer
 Gillian Shephard, Baroness Shephard of Northwold (born 1940), British Conservative politician
 Gillian Slovo (born 1952), South African novelist, playwright and memoirist
 Gillian Small, American biologist
 Gillian Smith (born 1965), English cricketer
 Gillian Sorensen, senior advisor at the United Nations Foundation
 Gillian Spencer (born 1939), American soap opera actress and writer
 Gillian Stroudley (1925–1992), English painter and printmaker
 Gillian Taylforth (born 1955), English actress
 Gillian Akiko Thomson (born 1974), Filipino swimmer
 Gillian Tindall, British writer
 Gillian Triggs, Australian lawyer
 Gillian Vigman (born 1972), American comic actress
 Gillian Wearing (born 1963), English artist
 Gillian Weir (born 1941), English classical organist
 Gillian Welch (born 1967), American singer
 Gillian White (born 1975), American actress
 Gillian Whitehead (born 1941), New Zealand composer
 Gillian Wright (born 1960), English actress

Surname
 Mike Gillian (born 1964), American basketball coach

Arts, entertainment, and media

Fictional characters
 Gillian, in the novel Jill by Philip Larkin
 Gillian Andrassy, in the soap opera All My Children
 Gillian B. Loeb, in the DC universe
 Gillian Owens, in the novel and film Practical Magic
 Gillian Seed, the protagonist in the cyberpunk video game Snatcher
 Gillian Taylor, doctor in the 1986 film Star Trek IV: The Voyage Home

Other uses in arts, entertainment, and media
 "Gillian", a 1996 song on The Waifs (album) by the Australian folk group The Waifs
 Gillian, a novel by Frank Yerby

See also

 Jill (disambiguation)
 Jillian

Feminine given names